La caída ("The Fall") is a 1959 Argentine drama film directed by Leopoldo Torre Nilsson. It won the Silver Condor Award for Best Film was entered into the 9th Berlin International Film Festival.

In a survey of the 100 greatest films of Argentine cinema carried out by the Museo del Cine Pablo Ducrós Hicken in 2000, the film reached the 38th position.

Cast
 Elsa Daniel - Albertina
 Duilio Marzio - José María
 Lautaro Murúa - Uncle Lucas
 Lydia Lamaison - Marta
 Hebe Marbec - Laura
 Oscar Orlegui - Diego
 Carlos López Monet - Gustavo (as Carlos Monet)
 Mariela Reyes
 Mónica Grey
 Nora Singerman
 Pinky - Delfina
 Óscar Robledo
 Emma Bernal - Tía
 Enrique Kossi
 Miguel Caiazzo
 Mónica Linares

References

External links 
 

1959 films
1950s Spanish-language films
Argentine black-and-white films
1959 drama films
Films directed by Leopoldo Torre Nilsson
1950s Argentine films